Karedu is a village panchayat located in Ulavapadu, Prakasam District, Andhra Pradesh, India.The pincode of this village is 523292.

Karedu comes under Kandukur (Assembly constituency) and It is part of the Nellore Lok Sabha constituency.

Language 

Telugu is the local language here.

Sub Villages in Karedu 
 Alagayapalem
 Kotha pallipalem
 Upparapalem
 Vaka
 Bangaru palem
 Battisomaiah Pattapupalem
 Pollukatta Yanadisangam
 Akuthota Yanadisangam
 SC COLONY
 Tenkayachetlapalem
 Pathachinapallepalem
 Chinapallepalem
 Indiranagar Yanadi Colony
 Ramakrishnapuram
 Pedapallipalem

Banks 

State Bank of India, Karedu branch.

Villages in Prakasam district